German submarine U-249 was a Type VIIC U-boat of Nazi Germany's Kriegsmarine during World War II. The submarine was laid down on 23 January 1943 at the Friedrich Krupp Germaniawerft yard at Kiel as yard number 683, launched on 23 October 1943 and commissioned on 20 November under the command of Oberleutnant zur See Rolf Lindschau.

In two patrols, she sank no ships.

She surrendered on 10 May 1945 and was sunk on 13 December as part of Operation Deadlight.

Design
German Type VIIC submarines were preceded by the shorter Type VIIB submarines. U-249 had a displacement of  when at the surface and  while submerged. She had two shafts and two  propellers.

U-249 was fitted with five  torpedo tubes (four fitted at the bow and one at the stern), fourteen torpedoes, one  SK C/35 naval gun, (220 rounds), one  Flak M42 and two twin  C/30 anti-aircraft guns. The boat had a complement of between forty-four and sixty.

Armament

FLAK weaponry
U-249 was mounted with a single 3.7 cm Flakzwilling M43U gun on the rare LM 43U mount. The LM 43U mount was the final design of mount used on U-boats and is only known to be installed on U-boats (and ). The 3.7 cm Flak M42U was the marine version of the 3.7 cm Flak used by the Kriegsmarine on Type VII and Type IX U-boats. U-249 was mounted with two 2cm Flak C38 in a M 43U Zwilling mount with short folding shield on the upper Wintergarten. The M 43U mount was used on a number of U-boats (and ).

Service history
After training with the 5th U-boat Flotilla at Kiel, U-249 remained with that organization for front-line service from 1 January 1945.

First patrol
The boat's first patrol was preceded by a pair of short trips between Kiel in Germany, and Kristiansand and Bergen in Norway. Her first sortie proper started with her departure from Bergen on 7 March 1945. It finished in the same port on 16 March. While sailing on another non-classifiable voyage, she shot a Mosquito of No. 235 Squadron RAF down. The pilot was captured.

Second patrol and surrender
She left Bergen on 3 April 1945 and arrived at Portland, UK, flying the black flag of surrender on 10 May.

She was then briefly used by the British as the research ship N 86 before being transferred to Loch Ryan in Scotland for Operation Deadlight. She was sunk on 13 December 1945.

In May 2013 her official visitors' book, and Captain Kock's fixed-focus Zeiss binoculars, taken as spoils of war by the British officer who commanded her prize crew, were shown on the BBC television series Antiques Roadshow by the officer's son, himself a former submarine captain, who used the binoculars during his career.

References

Bibliography

External links

German Type VIIC submarines
World War II submarines of Germany
U-boats commissioned in 1943
U-boats sunk in 1945
1943 ships
Ships built in Kiel
Operation Deadlight
Maritime incidents in December 1945